Volontaire was a 40-gun  frigate of the French Navy.

On 20 November 1798, along with Insurgente, Volontaire, under Captain Laurent, captured the 14-gun corvette .

She sailed into Table Bay, unaware that the British had captured Cape Town. Diadem, flying a Dutch flag, came alongside. When Diadem ran up the British flag, Volontaire surrendered.

The Royal Navy took her into service as HMS Volontaire. Captain Josceline Percy commissioned her and sailed her to St Helena. There he took charge of a convoy for England.

The transports Anacreon and  sailed from the Cape of Good Hope on 11 March 1806 bound for France as cartels carrying Volontaires crew.

On 21 March, Volontaire sailed as escort to 17 transports in a convoy to Great Britain carrying invalids and Dutch prisoners.

In 1809, she took part in the Battle of Maguelone.

Fate
Volontaire was broken up in February 1826.

Notes, citations, and references
Notes

Citations

References

External links
 

Virginie-class frigates
1796 ships
Ships built in France
Captured ships
Frigates of the Royal Navy